Alan Blundell (born 18 August 1947) is an English footballer, who played as a wing half in the Football League for Tranmere Rovers. He also spent one season at Wigan Athletic, playing 35 games and scoring five goals in the Cheshire League.

References

External links

Tranmere Rovers F.C. players
English Football League players
Wigan Athletic F.C. players
Association football wing halves
1947 births
Living people
English footballers